Pierre Audi (born 1957 in Beirut, Lebanon) is a French-Lebanese theatre director and artistic director.

Early life
Audi is the son of the Lebanese banker Raymond Audi and Andrée Michel Fattal, the eldest of three children. Audi's family were originally from Saida, but he attended the French Lycée in Beirut. While still at school, he initiated a cinema club and invited speakers including the film directors Pier Paolo Pasolini and Jacques Tati.

For family reasons, he moved to Paris in France and there attended the Collège Stanislas de Paris. At the age of 17, Audi together with his family moved to England.  He studied history at Exeter College, Oxford. In his last year at Oxford during November 1977, he directed an Oxford University Dramatic Society production of Timon of Athens by William Shakespeare at the Oxford Playhouse.

Almeida Theatre
In 1979, Audi founded the Almeida Theatre, an experimental theatre in Islington, north  London. He directed many productions at the Almeida Theatre in the 1980s.

Dutch National Opera and later functions
From 1988 to 2018, Audi was the artistic director of the Dutch National Opera. Audi's productions with the Dutch National Opera include the first complete performance of the Ring Cycle in the Netherlands, the Lorenzo Da Ponte operas by Mozart, Francis Poulenc's Dialogues des Carmélites, Peter Greenaway's and Louis Andriessen's Rosa - A Horse Drama and Writing to Vermeer, Alexander Knaifel's Alice in Wonderland, and Claude Vivier's Rêves d'un Marco Polo. Audi commissioned the opera Life with an Idiot by Alfred Schnittke.

From 2005 to 2014, Audi also was the artistic director of the Holland Festival. As of October 2015 he is the artistic director of Park Avenue Armory, while continuing his work as artistic director of the Dutch National Opera. In September 2018 he left the Dutch National Opera after a thirty-year tenure, and became director of the Festival International d'Art Lyrique d'Aix-en-Provence.

References 

1957 births
Living people
Artists from Beirut
Alumni of Exeter College, Oxford
French theatre directors
Lebanese theatre directors
Lebanese artistic directors
Collège Stanislas de Paris alumni